Bellshill railway station served the town of Bellshill, North Lanarkshire, Scotland, from 1879 to 1951 on the Glasgow, Bothwell, Hamilton and Coatbridge Railway.

History 
The station was opened on 1 May 1879 by the North British Railway. It closed on 1 January 1917 but reopened on 2 June 1919, before closing permanently on 10 September 1951.

References

External links 

Disused railway stations in North Lanarkshire
Former North British Railway stations
Railway stations in Great Britain opened in 1879
Railway stations in Great Britain closed in 1917
Railway stations in Great Britain opened in 1919
Railway stations in Great Britain closed in 1951
1879 establishments in Scotland
1951 disestablishments in Scotland